Rhabdophis nuchalis, commonly known as the Hubei keelback, is a venomous keelback snake in the family Colubridae found in northeast India, Myanmar, China, and Vietnam.

References

Rhabdophis
Snakes of Southeast Asia
Snakes of China
Snakes of Vietnam
Snakes of Asia
Reptiles of India
Reptiles of Myanmar
Reptiles of Vietnam
Reptiles described in 1891
Taxa named by George Albert Boulenger